Honor of the Family is a 1931 American Pre-Code drama film released by First National Pictures (a subsidiary of Warner Bros.), starring Bebe Daniels and Warren William. It was based on the play by Emil Fabre, from the Honoré de Balzac novel, La Rabouilleuse.

This was the talkie debut for Warren William who would become one of the major stars for Warner Brothers over the next five years. It also marked Dita Parlo's first English-speaking role.

Cast
Bebe Daniels – Laura
Warren William – Captain Boris Barony
Alan Mowbray – Tony Revere
Blanche Friderici – Madame Boris
Frederick Kerr – Paul Barony
Dita Parlo – Roszi
Allan Lane – Joseph
Harry Cording – Kouski
Murray Kinnell – Captain Elek
C. Henry Gordon – Renard
Carl Miller – Lieutenant Kolman

Preservation status
The film is now considered to be a lost film, with no film elements known to exist. The soundtrack, recorded separately on Vitaphone disks, survives.

See also
List of lost films

References

External links

1931 films
Lost American films
First National Pictures films
American films based on plays
Films based on works by Honoré de Balzac
1930s English-language films
Films directed by Lloyd Bacon
1931 drama films
American drama films
American black-and-white films
1931 lost films
Lost drama films
1930s American films